Susan Rita Beardsmore (born 19 February 1955) is a former BBC television presenter who fronted the regional news programme Midlands Today for twenty years.

Early life
Born in Bedford, Beardsmore attended the independent Dame Alice Harpur School in her hometown, then studied for a BA in English and Politics at the University of Newcastle upon Tyne and also went to Luton College of Higher Education.

Career
Beardsmore joined the BBC in 1977 as secretary to the Manager of Operations and later as a production assistant. She became the first presenter of the Midlands news opt-outs for Breakfast Time in 1983 before becoming a main presenter of Midlands Today in 1987. She regularly presented the flagship 6:30pm programme with presenters such as Kay Alexander, Alan Towers, David Davies and Nick Owen. She left the programme in February 2003 and worked as the public space co-ordinator at BBC Birmingham in the city's Mailbox complex.

Beardsmore currently works as a freelance media trainer. She also goes to schools to teach people newspaper skills and making newspapers. When BBC radio internet broadcasts of live events (e.g. football matches) breach copyright guidelines, an announcement voiced by Sue is played instead.

Personal life
Beardsmore married Steven Pile, has one son, and a grandson. She received an MA in Mass Communications from the University of Leicester in February 1999.  She is a Chair of Governors at Benson School in Birmingham.

References

External links

Official website
Midlands Today
Sue Beardsmore after twenty five years

1955 births
People from Bedford
BBC newsreaders and journalists
Alumni of Newcastle University
Alumni of the University of Bedfordshire
Living people
People educated at Dame Alice Harpur School